Hamwarde is a municipality in the district of Lauenburg, in Schleswig-Holstein, Germany.

The town was an objective of, and was eventually captured by, the 2nd Bn, Gordon Highlanders, 227th Highland Brigade, part of the 15th (Scottish) Infantry Division during the operations to cross the River Elbe in April 1945.

References

Herzogtum Lauenburg